Day for Night was an art and music festival in Houston, Texas that "explores the deep connections between light, technology, sound and space".  Producer Omar Afra co-conceived the idea of a festival experience that would reintroduce visual art back into the musical experience on a large scale when Kiffer Keegan pitched the idea of including new media installations during preparations for Free Press Summer Festival 2014.

Conception 
Omar Afra and Work-Order partners Kiffer Keegan and Keira Alexandra conceptualized the idea for the unique event while working together on Free Press Summer Fest 2014. Their ideas for incorporating visual art with music didn't fit into the model of their already-existing annual music festival, Free Press Summer Fest. Borrowing from their past experience, they began work on Day for Night in the summer of 2015 and chose Alex Czetwertynski to be the [Visual Arts] Curator.

Production 
Day for Night showcased musicians and visual artists. The production layout varied each year depending on the venue. On average, there were 3-4 stages with musicians performing in tandem, and visual art displays throughout the venue. The lineup for musicians featured artists with a heavy emphasis on stage presence and performance regardless of notoriety or genre.

2015  
The festival took place in the six block area surrounding Silver Street Studios on December 19 through December 20, 2015. The event featured three stages for musical acts; the red stage featured the big-name acts, the green stage was for electronic or atmospheric acts, and the blue stage for the local or obscure acts. The art installations were set up in between the stages and throughout the venue. [Consequence of Sound]

Music Lineup

Digital Artists

2016  
The festival took place at the Barbara Jordan Post office in downtown Houston on December 18–19.

Music Lineup

Digital Artists

2017  
The festival took place at the Barbara Jordan Post office in downtown Houston on December 15–17.

Music Lineup

Digital Artists

Controversy 
After allegations of sexual misconduct with two women by festival founder Omar Afra emerged in August, 2018, the festival cut ties with Afra and foreclosed on the festival-owning entity, removing him from any involvement or ownership. An open records request from Houston Police Department summarized the incident by stating "No injuries, No evidence, No arrest." Afra denied the allegations and called them "patently false."

On November 26, 2018, an auction was held for Afra's ownership stake, due to an unfulfilled loan agreement. The ownership stake was sold to FPH Chicken Holdings, who were owed the debt. They intend to pursue additional legal action for the remaining $670,000 owed. FPH Chicken Holdings is now the sole owner of the entity that owns both Free Press Summer Fest and Day for Night. Afra additionally cut ties with Free Press Houston.  The festival did not take place in 2018 and it is unclear if it will be held again.

References

External links
 

Arts in Houston
Festivals in Houston
Music of Houston
Music festivals in Texas